Jump rings are (usually metal) rings used to make chains, jewelry, and chain mail. They are made by wrapping wire around a mandrel to make a coil, then cutting the coil with wire cutters to make individual rings. The rings can be assembled one by one into chains, earrings, objects such as bowls or ornaments, and chain mail clothing.

The making of items from jump rings is called chain maille ("maille" is French for "mesh"). 

Jump rings can be described by the following qualities:

References

Jewellery components